KK (born Kevin Kerrigan, 1 December 1975) is a British composer, record producer and sound designer, best known for his work as a composer and music producer in the field of contemporary/pop music. His past work includes collaborations with Brian Eno, Björk, James, Dido, Natalie Imbruglia and Mediaeval Baebes.

Kerrigan has composed extensively for television channels such as Dave, Discovery Channel, BBC, ITV, Channel 4, E4, National Geographic Channel, Bravo, TLC and History Channel, and for 
various commercial clients

He collaborated with James Newton Howard on the soundtrack to Collateral (2004, Paramount Pictures), and has since composed soundtracks to other films such as The Thompsons (2012, Lionsgate) and Holy Ghost People (2013), "A Beginners Guide To Snuff" (2016),  and "The Night Watchmen" (2016),  as well as TV series such as Stage School (Channel 4)

With Sophie Barker (of Zero 7), KK forms half of the children's group The Rainbow Collections (Sony Music), whose popular releases have included Lullaby (2004), Toybox (2010) and Snowflake (2010).

Other album releases as a recording artist include Chiaroscuro (2019), Solasta (2017), Empty World (2011), The Magic Lantern (2009) and Telescopes (2007).

References

External links
 Official Website
 Kevin Kerrigan on Spotify
 
 The Rainbow Collections

Alumni of Middlesex University
British multi-instrumentalists
1975 births
Living people
British composers